Josephine Butler College is a college at Durham University. It is located at the Howlands Farm site next to residences of Stephenson College. In the centre of the college is a grass-covered hill, called "The Mound."

It is a fully self-catered college of the university with facilities far more modern than many of the existing undergraduate colleges in Durham (the newest of which was opened in 1972, with South College opening in 2020) and all rooms are en-suite. The college bar is the largest of all the college bars in Durham. The college has extensive leisure facilities including a library, study spaces, sports hall, outdoor tennis court and music room.

On 14 December 2005, it was announced that the college had been named after Josephine Butler, a Victorian feminist campaigner and a grand-niece of the 2nd Earl Grey, after whom Grey College was named.

Shield and motto
The college arms are blazoned as "Gules on a chevron Or charged with a Cross formy, with cotises invected, between in chief two lions Argent and in base an open book charged with two covered cups. The arms represent in large the heritage of Josephine Butler, with the lion argent being a symbol of the Grey family, of which Earl Grey (whom Grey College is named after) was Josephine Butler's uncle. Further the covered cups on the pages of the books are a heraldic symbol of the Butler family.

The college's motto is "Comme je trouve", which can be translated to "as I find" and is intended to mean 'we take life as we find it and make of it the best we can'.

Facilities

Howlands Building
The Howlands building is shared with Butler's neighbouring college, Stephenson College. Howlands contains the college gym, laundry and music room. A large multi-purpose hall is also contained in the building that is used to host formal dinners and paves the way for some sports activities, where badminton and table tennis clubs practise.

Butler Building

The Butler building acts as the main social building of the college and mainly contains the college bar and some other rooms such as the college offices, porters lodge and reception, in addition to the JCR, the MCR, TV room, college library lounge, IT suite, and study spaces.

Accommodation blocks and the Mound

Butler is placed around the "Mound", which stands between Butler and Stephenson College. The college has four separate self-contained accommodation blocks; Kirknewton, Dilston, Milfield, Wooler, as well as a small fifth block called Elm. Each building is divided up into 6 bed-roomed flats, with en-suite facilities. The main four accommodation blocks are all named after locations related to Josephine Butler's life: she was born in Milfield, spent a lot of her early life in Dilston, died in Wooler and is buried in Kirknewton. The buildings of Dilston, Milfield and Wooler are used to house mainly first year undergraduate students, whilst Kirknewton is used for returners and post-graduate students.

In July 2017 Josephine Butler College accommodation was ranked fourth best student halls in the UK, based on analysis of over 10,000 student and graduate reviews.

Societies

The college has its own theatre company, Suffragette Theatre Company, as well as a Film Society and a Music Society. The JCR governs college societies.

Josephine Butler College Cricket Club (JBCCC) 
Josephine Butler College Cricket Club (JBCCC) is the college's cricket team. As of 2018 the club consists of two outdoor sides, the A team and the Development team, and two indoor teams, an A and B team. Indoor cricket is played across the Epiphany term, and in the Easter term outdoor T20 cricket is played. The club won back to back indoor titles in 2014 and 2015. In 2018 they reached the final of the outdoor T20 competition. In the same year a 24-hour charity cricket match was held in the Howlands, which raised over £700 for the Glenn McGrath Foundation.

Butler College Boat Club 
Butler College Boat Club (BCBC) is the boat club of Josephine Butler College, at Durham University. The club is responsible for hosting its own inter-collegiate head race, Butler Head. In 2015 a BCBC VIII beat 3 other boats including the University of Leeds to get to the final of Durham Regatta. The biggest success came to the boat club in the 2016 Durham Regatta season where the 2015 BCBC VIII took the title of Durham Regatta by winning the Alderman Thurlow Trophy.

Suffragette Theatre Company 
Suffragette Theatre Company (STC), formerly known as the Society of Theatrical Arts at Butler (STAB), is the Drama society for Josephine Butler College. The Theatre Company accepts members from in and outside of the college, and focuses on politically and socially charged productions, such as its production of 'The Tempest' at the Gala Theatre in June 2019. The society is primarily known in college for its formal that is held in Michaelmas term every year, involving a Murder Mystery style format.

Sports 
Alongside its various societies, Josephine Butler College also has an extensive array of sports clubs open to its students. Some of the sports available include: football, rugby, badminton, boxing, running, rowing, lacrosse, basketball, dance etc., as well as more varied activities such as cheerleading, ultimate frisbee, pool and darts. Due to the collegiate system at Durham, there are over 700 different sports teams in the university, including Team Durham. Within Butler College itself there are over 40 teams and 20 sports available. Most sports also have multiple teams to cater for people of differing abilities, this allows complete beginners to pick up a new sports whilst also enabling experienced athletes to strive for success.

List of principals
The head of college is titled the Principal. Adrian Simpson was the Principal from the college's foundation in 2006  announcing in 2022 that he was stepping down to take on the role of Principal at St Mary's College. During periods of the Principal's  absence, the Vice-Principal has taken on the role of Acting Principal.

References

External links
 Official website
 JCR website
 MCR website

Colleges of Durham University
Educational institutions established in 2006
2006 establishments in England